Immanuel Baptist Church is Baptist church in central Yangon at the corner of Mahar Bandoola Garden Street and Mahar Bandoola Road opposite Yangon City Hall.

History

Built in 1885 by an American missionary, the church was destroyed during World War II but rebuilt in 1952. Until 1965, the pastor of the church was sent by the American Baptist International Ministries, which at that time was called the American Baptist Foreign Mission Society. One of the founders of that missionary organisation was Adoniram Judson, who lived in Burma from 1813 to his death in 1850. The church is on the Yangon City Heritage List, a list of man-made landmarks designated by the governmental Yangon City Development Committee.

In the early 1960s over 90 percent of the congregation were Burmese, including ethnically Anglo-Indian and Anglo-Burmese.

Pastors
1951-1959 Brown, Rev. Russell E.
1960-1965 Allen, Bradley Moore
1965-1967 Unknown
1967-1990 Poba, George C.
1990-2013 F. John, Paul
2013-Current   Rev.D Yaw Lar

See also
 Myanmar Baptist Convention

References

Buildings and structures in Yangon
Christianity in Yangon
Churches in Yangon